Bowler Rocks is a group of rocks off the north coast of Greenwich Island in the South Shetland Islands, Antarctica lying southwest of Table Island and northwest of Aitcho Islands, and extending  in east-west direction.  The area was visited by early 19th-century sealers.

The feature is named after David Bowler, surveying recorder aboard the launch Nimrod during the Royal Navy hydrographic survey of the rocks in 1967.

Location

See also
 Composite Antarctic Gazetteer
 Greenwich Island
 List of Antarctic islands south of 60° S
 SCAR
 Territorial claims in Antarctica

Maps
 L.L. Ivanov. Antarctica: Livingston Island and Greenwich, Robert, Snow and Smith Islands. Scale 1:120000 topographic map.  Troyan: Manfred Wörner Foundation, 2009.

References

External links
 SCAR Composite Antarctic Gazetteer.

Islands of the South Shetland Islands